The presidency of Francisco Sagasti in Peru started on 17 November 2020 in the midst of a constitutional crisis which resulted in multiple presidential successions to complete the remaining 2020-2021 presidential term. The administration has been deemed as a "Transitional government" and an "Emergency government" in light of the COVID-19 pandemic, an economic recession, and a political crisis which dominated Peruvian life.

Ascension to the presidency 
On 15 November 2020, following the resignation of interim president Manuel Merino and the executive board of Congress, the legislative body elected a new President of Congress that through presidential succession, would assume the role of President. The first list of candidates was headed by Rocio Silva-Santisteban of Frente Amplio, who did not reach the vote threshold to become President of Congress. The second list of candidates had congressmen from Partido Morado, Frente Amplio, Accion Popular, and Somos Peru, which was approved.

Presidency

National Police 
Five days after the inauguration, Sagasti announced major changes in the executive board of the National Police and announced that César Cervantes would be appointed as the National General.

References

Democratization
2020 in Peru
Provisional governments
Sagasti